"Paris" is a song recorded by American singer Sabrina Carpenter from her third studio album Singular: Act I (2018), served as the second track of the album. The track was written by Carpenter, Brett McLaughlin and Jason Evigan with Evigan handling the production and McLaughlin and Gian Stone vocal producing. The song was released by Hollywood Records as the first promotional single from Singular: Act I on October 24, 2018 along with the pre-order of the album. The song talks about Paris, the city of love and thinking of a lover in Los Angeles while there.

Background and recording
"Paris" was written in May 2017 by Carpenter, Brett McLaughlin and Jason Evigan, after Carpenter's first trip to Paris in her 18th birthday. In the recording session at Chumba Meadows Studio in Tarzana, California, Leland asked Carpenter about her trip to Paris and Evigan start to play Eastern European chords and that's when they started to write the song.

Composition and lyrical interpretation 
Musically, "Paris" is a three minutes and thirty five seconds R&B song. Lyrically, the song talks about Carpenter being in Paris, the city of love and being reminded of a Los Angeles lover while there. Carpenter stated that the lyric "Why'd it take so long for me to know this / Scared to put the water with the roses" is her favorite lyric from the album, she explained the lyric by saying "You are purposefully not allowing yourself to see something, [...] to growing in terms, but it was right in front of you".

Critical reception 
The Line of Best Fit wrote "the album’s excellent first promotional single “Paris” brings in bells and synths as she sings of returning to an old muse after exploring a new city".  Mike Neid for Idolator said "“Paris.” An ode to the city of love" [...]  "However, instead of shacking up with a sexy Parisian, the rising star is bombarded with memories of her Los Angeles lover."

Music video 
The music video was released through Vevo and YouTube on December 21, 2018. Carpenter teased photos from music video coming up to its release date. It was directed by Jasper Cable-Alexander and shows clips of Carpenter in a hotel room and on the streets of Paris.

Live performances 
Carpenter debuted the song at the Singular: Act I launch event in London. The song was twelfth to be performed on the Singular Tour. Additionally, she performed the song on Good Morning America's Summer Concert Series.

Track listing

Credits and personnel 
Recording and management
Recorded at Chumba Meadows (Tarzana, California)
Mixed at Hercules St. Studios (Sydney, Australia)
Mastered at Sterling Sound (New York City)
BMG Platinum Songs/Bad Robot Music (BMI) (all rights administered by BMG Rights Management (US) LLC), EMI April Music Inc/Bob Ochoa’s Homemade Salsa (ASCAP), Seven Summits Music (BMI) obo Itself and Pink Mic Music (BMI)

Personnel

Sabrina Carpenter – vocals, songwriting
Brett McLaughlin – songwriting, vocal production, engineering
Jason Evigan – songwriting, production, vocal production, all instruments, programming
Gian Stone – vocal production, engineering
Eric J. Dubowsky – mixing
Tim Watt  – mix assistant
Chris Gehringer – mastering

Credits adapted from Singular: Act I liner notes.

Release history

References 

2018 singles
Sabrina Carpenter songs
Songs written by Sabrina Carpenter
2018 songs
Songs written by Jason Evigan
Songs written by Leland (musician)
Songs about Paris